Rush House, also known as Sebastian Rush Hotel and Tavern, was a historic inn and tavern located at Wharton Township, Fayette County, Pennsylvania.  It was built about 1837, and is a -story, 5-bay, brick and stone building with a center hall floor plan. It has a rear ell. The South and East sides of the building are built of brick, and the North and West sides of fieldstone.  It was built by Congressman Andrew Stewart (1791-1872).  It served as a stop for 19th-century travelers on the National Road. It operated as a hotel until 1962.  The house was demolished in January 2018.

It was added to the National Register of Historic Places in 1978.

References

Hotel buildings on the National Register of Historic Places in Pennsylvania
Hotel buildings completed in 1837
Buildings and structures in Fayette County, Pennsylvania
National Register of Historic Places in Fayette County, Pennsylvania
Buildings and structures demolished in 2018
Demolished buildings and structures in Pennsylvania